The 2008–09 Kazakhstan Hockey Championship was the 17th season of the Kazakhstan Hockey Championship, the top level of ice hockey in Kazakhstan. Eight teams participated in the league, and Barys Astana won the championship.

Standings

First round

Final round

References
Kazakh Ice Hockey Federation

Kazakhstan Hockey Championship
2008 in Kazakhstani sport
2009 in Kazakhstani sport
Kazakhstan Hockey Championship seasons
1